CD94 (Cluster of Differentiation 94), also known as killer cell lectin-like receptor subfamily D, member 1 (KLRD1) is a human gene.

The protein encoded by CD94 gene is a lectin, cluster of differentiation and a receptor that is involved in cell signaling and is expressed on the surface of natural killer cells in the innate immune system.  CD94 pairs with the NKG2 molecule as a heterodimer.  The CD94/NKG2 complex, on the surface of natural killer cells interacts with Human Leukocyte Antigen (HLA)-E on target cells.

Function 

Natural killer (NK) cells are a distinct lineage of lymphocytes that mediate cytotoxic activity and secrete cytokines upon immune stimulation. Several genes of the C-type lectin superfamily, including members of the NKG2 family, are expressed by NK cells and may be involved in the regulation of NK cell function. KLRD1 (CD94) is an antigen preferentially expressed on NK cells and is classified as a type II membrane protein because it has an external C terminus. KLRD1 has two alternatively spliced variants that differ in the presence or absence of exon 2 sequence.

Interactions 

KLRD1 has been shown to interact with KLRC2.

See also 
 Cluster of differentiation
 CD94/NKG2

References

Further reading

External links 
 

Clusters of differentiation
C-type lectins